The Ädiz clan was the second imperial clan of the Uyghur Khaganate.

Tribe 
The Ädiz clan was originally a member of the Tiele Confederation and not a Uyghur subtribe; Chinese sources listed Ädiz (阿跌 Ädiē) as the 14th of, at least, 15 named Tiele tribes. They were living on shores of Syr Darya during the 7th century. They later migrated to near Baikal lake, and became part of Xueyantuo during the reign of Zhenzhu Khan. After their submission to the Tang dynasty, they were appointed to Jitian Prefecture (雞田州) — one of the prefectures that the Tang dynasty established for the settlement of Tiele tribes that submitted to the Tang during the reign of Emperor Taizong in the Hequ (河曲, i.e., the Ordos Desert region). Their chieftain Ädie Liangchen (阿跌良臣, literally: "Good Minister from the Ädiz") and his tribal army were part of the army of Shuofang Circuit (朔方, headquartered in modern Yinchuan, Ningxia). His son Ädiz Guangyan (Li Guangyan) later adopted an imperial surname and became a general in the Tang army. He died in 826.

Ädiz clan was also mentioned in Orkhon Inscriptions as a tribe subjugated by Kűl Tegin.

Royal clan 
The founder of the royal clan of the Uyghur Khaganate, Qutluq was initially a member of the Ädiz clan. He was orphaned early in childhood and adopted by the Yaglakar clan. After Qutluq Bilge's untimely death, he succeeded to the qaghanate upon election by the nobles. He didn't change his surname back to the original one, but kept the Yaglakar name, nevertheless he exiled all of the remaining princes from cadet branches to Chang'an.

A son of Chongde Qaghan, Womosi was later created Prince of Huaihua (懷化王) and was bestowed the Imperial Clan surname Li (李). Wamosi's brothers Alizhi (阿歷支), Xiwuchuo (習勿啜), and Wuluosi (烏羅思) were given the names of Li Sizhen (李思貞), Li Siyi (李思義), and Li Sili (李思禮), respectively.

References 

 
Clans
Nomadic groups in Eurasia
Turkic dynasties
Uyghur Khaganate
9th century in China